The Murutic languages are a family of half a dozen closely related Austronesian languages, spoken in the northern inland regions of Borneo by the Murut and Tidung.

Languages
The Murutic languages are (Lobel 2013):
Murut proper
Timugon Murut and Tagol Murut
Murut dialects
Keningau Murut, Beaufort Murut (Binta’), Tabalunan/Serudung Murut, Selungai Murut, Sembakung Murut, Okolod, Bookan, Tanggala Murut, Paluan, Agabag/Tinggalan Murut.

Tidung language
Burusu, Kalabakan, Nonukan Tidong, Sesayap Tidong

Tagol Murut is commonly used and understood by a large majority of the Murut peoples.

Lobel (2013:360) also lists the languages Abai Sembuak, Abai Tubu, and Bulusu (all spoken near Malinau town in North Kalimantan) as Murutic languages. On the other hand, Abai Sungai, spoken in eastern Sabah, is a Paitanic language.

Lobel (2016)
Lobel (2016) covers the following Greater Murutic languages, including Tidong:
Tatana
Papar
Murut Nabaay
Gana
Murut Timugon
Murut Paluan
Murut Tagol
Kolod
Western Tingalan
Eastern Tingalan
Murut Kalabakan
Abai Sembuak
Abai Tubu
Bulusu
Tidung Bengawong
Tidung Sumbol
Tidung Kalabakan
Tidung Mensalong
Tidung Malinau

Innovations
Lobel (2013:367) lists the following Murutic phonological innovations. (Note: PSWSAB stands for Proto-Southwest Sabahan, while PMP stands for Proto-Malayo-Polynesian.)
PMP/PSWSAB *R > *h / __ V (except after *ə, where it had already shifted to *g in PSWSAB). Subsequently, Proto-Greater Murutic *h > Ø occurred in all daughter languages except Papar.
PMP/PSWSAB *R > *g / __ #
PMP/PSWSAB *aw > *ow; *ay > *oy
PMP/PSWSAB *iw > *uy
PGMUR *g- > Ø after the adjectival prefix *ma-
PMP/PSWSAB *ə > *a in non-final syllables, except in the environment *_Cə, where it is reflected as /o/

References

Lobel, Jason William. 2013. Philippine and North Bornean languages: issues in description, subgrouping, and reconstruction. Ph.D. dissertation. Manoa: University of Hawai'i at Manoa.
Lobel, Jason William. 2016. North Borneo Sourcebook: Vocabularies and Functors. University of Hawaii Press.